What Fools Men is a 1925 American silent drama film directed by George Archainbaud and starring Lewis Stone, Shirley Mason, and Ethel Grey Terry.

Plot
As described in a film magazine review, Joseph Greer has invented a new linen-making process and asks Williamson and his associates to finance him. Williamson and the others intend to swindle Greer, who gets his secretary, Jenny McFarlan to watch them. His wife, from whom he has been separated for years, wishes a divorce. Greer sends for his eighteen year old daughter whom he has never seen, and gives her an automobile and has her introduced into society. Mrs. Williamson attempts to make love to Greer, who repulses her. She tells Williamson that Greer has forced his attentions on her. This strengthens Williamson’s resolve to break him. Greer goes on a business trip and leaves his daughter in Jenny’s charge. Beatrice one night goes to a wild party, from which she is rescued by her chauffeur, who loves her. Greer finds her intoxicated and discharges the chauffeur. Beatrice runs away and marries the chauffeur and Williamson succeeds in breaking Greer. Greer begins to drink and finally disappears. Jenny locates him. He returns, is reunited with his daughter, and decides to begin a new life with Jenny as his partner.

Cast

Preservation
With no prints of What Fools Men located in any film archives, it is a lost film.

References

Bibliography
Jacobs, Lea (2008). The Decline of Sentiment: American Film in the 1920s. University of California Press.

External links

1925 films
1925 drama films
Silent American drama films
Films directed by George Archainbaud
American silent feature films
1920s English-language films
First National Pictures films
American black-and-white films
Lost American films
1925 lost films
Lost drama films
1920s American films